Louis "Kid" Kaplan (born October 15, 1901 in Kyiv, Ukraine – October 26, 1970) was a professional boxer and a 1925 world featherweight champion.

Early life

Kaplan and his family emigrated to the United States from the Kyiv when he was five years old and settled in Meriden, Connecticut. While selling fruit for five cents a day, he began boxing as a teenager at the Lenox Athletic Club in Meriden, and turned professional in 1919.

Professional career 

Kaplan began his boxing career in the Connecticut State circuit. At the time, Meriden was an epicenter of boxing in the Northeastern United States. Early in his career, Kaplan fought the popular local favorite and former New York State champion Charlie Pilkington. Though they never boxed a professional match together, their early rivalry and Pilkington's role as a mentor and sparring partner had much to do with launching Kaplan's very successful boxing career.

A busy fighter, he engaged in over 50 bouts in his first four years in the paid ranks. During one of his early fights in 1920, Kaplan knocked out opponent Sailor Cunningham within two minutes.

After winning against Hughie Hutchinson and Earl Baird in 1922, Kaplan gained significant popularity.

In 1923 he twice drew with rival Babe Herman before scoring a 10-round win over future world lightweight champ Jimmy Goodrich.

World featherweight champion, 1925 

By late 1924, World Featherweight champion Johnny Dundee vacated his title and a tournament was arranged to determine a successor. "Kid" kayoed Angel Diaz  in three rounds, outpointed Bobby Garcia over 10-rounds, and then halted Joe Lombardo in four rounds to advance to the finals. On January 2, 1925 he knocked out Danny Kramer in nine rounds at Madison Square Garden to become the new champion. His first two defenses were against the familiar Babe Herman (D15 and W15) in late 1925. Kaplan next decisioned Hall of Famer Billy Petrolle over 12 rounds in a non-title bout.

However, Kaplan's reign as champion was nearing its end. Despite standing 5 ft 4 in., he was experiencing difficulty making the featherweight limit and decided to relinquish the crown to campaign as a lightweight in 1927. As a 135-pounder, he scored wins over Jackie Fields, Johnny Jadick, Billy Wallace,  Battling Battalino and Sammy Mandell among others.  Amongst the wins were losses to Wallace and Hall of Famer Jimmy McLarnin. In 1933 he lost to  Herbert "Cocoa Kid" Lewis Hardwick,  and promptly retired from the ring with a 108-17-13D- 12 ND (26KOs) record.

Known as a rugged, pressing boxer who possessed tremendous stamina, the crowd-pleasing "Meriden Buzzsaw" died on October 26, 1970 in Norwich, CT.

Halls of Fame 

Kaplan was inducted into the International Boxing Hall of Fame in 2003.

Kaplan, who was Jewish, was inducted into the International Jewish Sports Hall of Fame in 1986.

Miscellaneous 

Brother of fellow boxer Israel "Izzy" Kaplan

Professional boxing record
All information in this section is derived from BoxRec, unless otherwise stated.

Official Record

All newspaper decisions are officially regarded as “no decision” bouts and are not counted to the win/loss/draw column.

Unofficial record

Record with the inclusion of newspaper decisions to the win/loss/draw column.

See also 

 List of select Jewish boxers

Professional championships

References

External links 
 
 Cyber Boxing Zone Bio

1901 births
1970 deaths
American people of Ukrainian-Jewish descent
Featherweight boxers
Boxers from Connecticut
Emigrants from the Russian Empire to the United States
Jewish American boxers
Jewish boxers
Sportspeople from Kyiv
World featherweight boxing champions
American male boxers
20th-century American Jews